The 2007 Continental Indoor Football League season was the league's second season.  The league champions were the Rochester Raiders, who defeated the Michigan Pirates in the CIFL Indoor Championship Game.

Standings

 Green indicates clinched playoff berth
 Purple indicates division champion
 Grey indicates clinched best league record

Playoffs

2007 Award winners
Most Valuable Player (Vincent Cleveland Memorial Trophy) - Robert Height, Port Huron Pirates
Offensive Player of the Year - Robert Height, Port Huron Pirates
Defensive Player of the Year - Eddie Bynes, Port Huron Pirates
Special Teams Player of the Year - Brad Selent, Kalamazoo Xplosion
CIFL Indoor Championship Game Most Valuable Player - Mike Condello, Rochester Raiders
Coach of the Year - Karl Featherstone, Port Huron Pirates

External links
 CIFL Website
 2007 CIFL Stat Leaders